Kisvárda is a town in Szabolcs-Szatmár-Bereg County, in the Northern Great Plain region of eastern Hungary near the border of Slovakia and Ukraine. It is the 3rd largest town in Szabolcs-Szatmár-Bereg after Nyíregyháza and Mátészalka with a population of 16 669 people. The Subregion of Kisvárda lies between two large landscapes, the Nyírség and the Rétköz.

Etymology
The name of the town, which means "little castle" in Hungarian, dates back to the Conquest of Hungary. The conquering Hungarians named the town for its earthwork. In the Middle Ages, it occurred like Warda and Warada in documents. The "kis" (meaning little) word part was added to differentiate the town from Nagyvárad (now Oradea, Romania), "nagy" meaning great or large.

Coat of arms

The red and white stripes on the shield symbolize the Árpád Dynasty, the medieval kings of Hungary. The sword with the Sun and green background shows the heroic knights of Kisvárda. The scales represents the town's trade and markets. In the middle of the shield there is the Castle of Kisvárda in gold. There is a dark green, winged dragon around the shield, choking itself with its tail wrapped around its neck. This is the insignia of the Order of the Dragon which derives from the Várday family's coat of arms.

History

The conquering Hungarians found a hill fort here in 895 which then they used for their border protection system.

St. Ladislaus defeated the Kuntesk Cuman prince in 1085 in a great fight. In memory of the glorious battle, he had a church established. He dedicated it to St Peter and St Paul Apostles.

In the 12th century, the settlement's importance declined. The castle became the possession of the Swabian-Swedish Gutkeled family. The settlement was the denominator of one branch of the family, the Várdays. The Várday family worked a lot to revive Kisvárda. Shortly the place got their fair housing law.

Pelbárt Várady got permission from the king to build the Castle of Kisvárda in 1415.

In 1421, it became a town. István Várday, the Archbishop of Kalocsa, Matthias Corvinus's chancellor expended the town's autonomy in 1468. At that time, the population of Kisvárda was more than a thousand people. It became the centre of Szabolcs. The first guild was formed in 1591.

Because of the Turkish conquest of Hungary and the economic changes, the town's importance diminished.

Prior to World War II, Kisvárda had a large Jewish community that represented about 30 percent of the town's population.  They were confined to a ghetto in 1944, and then deported to Auschwitz.  The majority perished there.  A small community was re-established after the war, but almost no Jews are left in Kisvárda today.  The former synagogue, which remains one of the most imposing structures in Kisvárda, is now a local history museum known as the Rétközi Múzeum.

Economy

Historically, Kisvárda has been a market town for the surrounding agricultural district, and is also has some light industry such as distilling, electrics, and brake pad production.  It is on the main railway line from the Hungarian capital of Budapest to Ukraine.  Kisvárda also attracts tourists to its thermal springs, and the ruins of a medieval castle.

Notable people

 Bertalan Farkas, astronaut
 Krisztina Nyáry (1604-1641)
 ByeAlex, Hungarian singer, songwriter
 Sándor Radó, Hungarian psychoanalyst
 Victor Varconi, Hungarian filmstar who rose to fame in the silent era
 Arnost Zvi Ehrman (1914-1976), Israeli jurist

Rabbis
 Moshe Grunwald (1853–1910), progenitor of the Pupa Hasidic dynasty through his five sons
 Shimon Sofer (1850–1944), Rav of the Hungarian city of Eger
 Tibor Rosenbaum (1923–1980), rabbi and businessman

Politics
 Attila Tilki (1967-), politician
 Péter Kozma (1959-2017), politician
 Dr. Miklós Seszták (1968-), jurist, politician, Minister of National Development(2014-), vice president of KDNP
 József Tóbiás (1970-), politician, former leader of the MSZP (2014-2016)
 Dov Gruner, Hungarian-born Zionist activist, member of the Irgun

Sports

Football
 Volodymyr Kornutyak (1983-), footballer
 Dušan Pavlov (1989-), footballer
 Yves Mboussi (1987-), footballer
 Zoltan Silvashi (1993-), footballer
 László Miskolczi (1986-), footballer
 Dávid Oláh (1988-), footballer
 Ignác Irhás (1985-), footballer
 Valér Kapacina (1993-), footballer
 Tamás Csilus (1995-), footballer
 Norbert Heffler (1990-), footballer
 Miroslav Grumić (1984-), footballer
 Zsolt Bognár (1979-), footballer
 Zoltán Molnár (1971-), footballer
 Gábor Bardi (1982-), footballer
 Gábor Jánvári (1990-), footballer
 Zoltán Horváth (1989-), footballer
 Raymond Lukacs (1988-), footballer
 Patrik Bacsa (1992-), footballer
 Sergiu Oltean (1987-), footballer
 András Gosztonyi (1990-), footballer
 Péter Baráth (2002-), footballer

Handball
 Ivett Nagy (1982-), handballer
 Gabriella Juhász, Hungarian handballer
 Ivett Nagy, Hungarian handballer
 Gabriella Juhász (1985-), handballer
 Ágnes Hornyák (1982-), handballer

Other
 Éva Kaptur (1987-), athlete
 Gyula Halasy (1891-1970), sport shooter
 Ervin Acel (1888-1858), American fencer

Twin towns – sister cities

Kisvárda is twinned with:
 Hildburghausen, Germany
 Karmiel, Israel
 Kráľovský Chlmec, Slovakia
 Mukachevo, Ukraine
 Strzyżów, Poland
 Târgu Secuiesc, Romania

Sport
Kisvárda FC, association football club
Kisvárdai KC, handball team

References

External links 

  in Hungarian
 Memorial Book of the Jews of Kisvarda and its Vicinity, Ed: Rabbi Dr. Karoly Jolesz, et al., Tel Aviv, Kleinwardein Society, 1980

 
Populated places in Szabolcs-Szatmár-Bereg County